Phrynetopsis marshalli is a species of beetle in the family Cerambycidae. It was described by Stephan von Breuning in 1935. It is known from Sierra Leone and Ghana.

References

Phrynetini
Beetles described in 1935